Henry Wilbur Bentley (September 30, 1838 – January 27, 1907) was an American educator, lawyer, and politician who served one term as a U.S. Representative from New York from 1891 to 1893.

Biography
Born in DeRuyter, Madison County, New York, Bentley was the son of Zadock T. and Lucy Caroline (Gardner) Bentley. He moved with his parents to Morrisville, New York, attended Morrisville Union School, Yates Polytechnic Institute, and Judd's private school in Berkshire. He married Mary M. Dickerman.

Career
Bentley taught school for several years and studied law. He was admitted to the bar in 1861 and commenced practice in Boonville, New York. He served as chairman of the Oneida County Building Commission, and as president of the village of Boonville in 1874, from 1889 to 1891, and in 1899.

Tenure in Congress 
Elected as a Democrat to the Fifty-second Congress in the Democratic landslide of 1890, Bentley was U.S. Representative for the twenty-third district of New York from March 4, 1891 to March 3, 1893.  He defeated incumbent Rep. James S. Sherman, the future Vice President of the United States. He was an unsuccessful candidate for reelection in 1892 to the Fifty-third Congress when Sherman defeated him and reclaimed his old seat. He continued the practice of law in Boonville, New York.

Death
Bentley died in Boonville, Oneida County, New York, on January 27, 1907 (age 68 years, 119 days). He is interred at Boonville Cemetery, Boonville, New York.

References

External links

1838 births
1907 deaths
People from Madison County, New York
People from Boonville, New York
New York (state) lawyers
Democratic Party members of the United States House of Representatives from New York (state)
19th-century American politicians
People from Morrisville, New York